In algebraic geometry, the Tschirnhausen cubic, or Tschirnhaus' cubic is a plane curve defined, in its left-opening form, by the polar equation

where  is the secant function.

History
The curve was studied by von Tschirnhaus, de L'Hôpital, and Catalan. It was given the name Tschirnhausen cubic in a 1900 paper by R C Archibald, though it is sometimes known as de L'Hôpital's cubic or the trisectrix of Catalan.

Other equations
Put . Then applying triple-angle formulas gives 

giving a parametric form for the curve. The parameter t can be eliminated easily giving the Cartesian equation
.

If the curve is translated horizontally by 8a and the signs of the variables are changed, the equations of the resulting right-opening curve are

and in Cartesian coordinates
.
This gives the alternative polar form 
.

Generalization
The Tschirnhausen cubic is a Sinusoidal spiral with n = −1/3.

References
 J. D. Lawrence, A Catalog of Special Plane Curves. New York: Dover, 1972, pp. 87-90.

External links
 
 "Tschirnhaus' Cubic" at MacTutor History of Mathematics archive
Tschirnhausen cubic at mathcurve.com

Plane curves